Ffion  is a Welsh feminine given name meaning foxglove.

People with this name
Aimee-Ffion Edwards, Welsh actress and singer
Ffion Bowen, Welsh rugby union player
Ffion Davies, Welsh practitioner of Brazilian jiu-jitsu
Ffion Hague, wife of former Conservative Party leader and former Foreign Secretary William Hague
Ffion Morgan, Welsh footballer

Fictional characters 
Ffion Foxwell, a character in the Black Mirror episode "The Entire History of You", played by Jodie Whittaker
Ffion Morgan, a character in the television series Casualty.

References

Welsh feminine given names
Given names